Glasgow Caledonian University, informally GCU, Caledonian or Caley, is a public university in Glasgow, Scotland. It was formed in 1993 by the merger of The Queen's College, Glasgow (founded in 1875) and Glasgow Polytechnic (founded in 1991).

In June 2017, the university's New York partner institution, which was founded in 2013, was granted permission to award degrees in the state, the first higher education institution founded by a foreign university to achieve this status.

History

The university traces its origin from The Queen's College, Glasgow (founded 1875), and the Glasgow College of Technology (founded 1971). The Queen's College, which specialised in providing training in domestic science, received the royal accolade of being named after Queen Elizabeth in its centenary celebrations in 1975. Queen Elizabeth was, herself, patron of the college since 1944. Glasgow Polytechnic, which was one of the largest central institutions in Scotland, offered externally validated degrees and diplomas in engineering, science, and the humanities: the first of which was a BA in Optics, followed by degrees in Social Sciences (1973) and Nursing (1977).

On 1 April 1993, the two institutions amalgamated to form Glasgow Caledonian University. The new university took its name from Caledonia, the poetic Latin name for present-day Scotland. The main campus of the university is built on the site of the former Buchanan Street Station, built by the Caledonian Railway.

Independent research carried out in 2015 revealed that the university contributes over £480m to Scotland's economy each year with the quantifiable lifetime premium of a one-year class of graduates estimated at £400m, bringing the university's total annual economic impact to around £880m in Scotland alone.

Annie Lennox was installed as GCU's first female chancellor, taking over the role from Nobel Peace Prize laureate Muhammad Yunus, at a ceremony in July 2018. Stephen Decent is the principal and vice-chancellor of the university, appointed in 2023.

Coat of arms and motto

The university's coat of arms is the work of university academic and artist Malcolm Lochhead and draws on four elements from the coat of arms of the university's predecessor institutions. The Caledonian oak tree (of St. Mungo's infamous legend) and the Book of Knowledge were borrowed from the arms of Glasgow Polytechnic while the saltire ermine and the crossed keys (intended to represent the "unlocking" of the Book of Knowledge) were taken from the arms of The Queen's College. A visual feature was added to the new arms with the illuminated capital letters in the Book's paragraphs reading: G C U (the three-letter abbreviation of the university's name). The coat of arms was matriculated by the Lord Lyon King of Arms and is inscribed into university degree parchments. The university's motto: "for the common weal", which has been adopted since 1975, features in the full design of the arms.

Campuses

GCU's main campus is in Glasgow city-centre. A second campus in London is home to the British School of Fashion. In September 2013 the university founded Glasgow Caledonian New York College, which is an independent partner institution whose Wooster Street campus is based in the city's SoHo district.

Organisation and administration

Academic schools

Computing, Engineering and Built Environment
GCU's IT, engineering and construction experience is housed within the School of Computing, Engineering and Built Environment. The school is composed of eight departments: 
 Applied Science (Control, Instrumentation and Forensics)
 Electrical and Electronic Engineering
 Mechanical Engineering
 Construction and Surveying
 Civil Engineering and Environmental Management
 Applied Computer Games
 Computing
 Cyber Security and Networks

The school's links with industry include the £1.2m Doble Innovation Centre for On-Line Systems, which works on diagnostic test instruments and expert consulting and knowledge exchange services for the electric power industry. GCU is also a partner in five of the Scottish government-funded collaborative innovation centres which bring knowledge from higher education institutions to solve real-world business challenges – these are DataLab, the Digital Health and Care Institute, Construction Scotland Innovation Centre, Oil and Gas Innovation Centre and CENSIS (sensors and imaging systems).

The school performs research into built environment and connections with industry leaders in growing markets such as games design. The school also has a Centre for Climate Justice, which is involved in policy relevant research for development, teaching and learning, and broadening knowledge in the area of climate justice.

The Glasgow School for Business and Society

The Glasgow School for Business and Society brings together disciplines in business, law and social sciences, teaching and research in fashion, tourism, risk management, finance and multimedia journalism.

The school leads the university-wide delivery of the Principles for Responsible Management Education (PRiME), a United Nations Global Compact-backed initiative which places social responsibility, ethics and sustainability at the top of the agenda for training future leaders. GCU became a PRiME signatory in January 2012 and is a founding member of the UK and Ireland PRiME Chapter.

GCU is a member of Business in the Community (BITC) Scotland and school students and staff manage the Work Ready Action Programme (WRAP), which sees students mentor school pupils from the Glasgow area.

In 2015, the school's 10 BA Business Programme Set and its MSc International Fashion Marketing Programmes achieved the EPAS accreditation, becoming the first institution in Scotland and one of only 69 recognised worldwide.

It is designated a centre of excellence by the Chartered Institute for Securities and Investment and is the only business school to offer triple-accredited degrees in financial services. The school is also home to the Moffat Centre, one of the world's university research centres in tourism and travel. freecoursesite

The school is composed of the following three departments:
 Department of Law, Economics, Accountancy & Risk
 Department of Business Management
 Department of Social Sciences, Media & Journalism

Health and Life Sciences
The School of Health and Life Sciences is one of Scotland's largest research and teaching centres in health care and life sciences; Scotland's only provider of optometry training; and home to an eye clinic, based on campus. GCU is ranked in the Top 20 in the UK for allied health research at world-leading and internationally excellent standards. The school is, since 1993, Scotland's only designated World Health Organization Collaborating Centre (WHOCC) for Nursing and Midwifery Education, Research, and Practice. It is also home to the Scottish Ambulance Academy; the only educational establishment in the UK to be formally endorsed by the College of Paramedics and certified by the Health and Care Professions Council, providing professional training for paramedics on behalf of the Scottish Ambulance Service. September 2017 seen the first intake of the BSc Paramedic Science course, the first direct-entry undergraduate paramedic course available in Scotland. The school is composed of the following three departments:

 Department of Nursing and Community Health
 Department of Psychology, Social Work and Allied Health Sciences
 Department of Life Sciences

Administration

By statute, the university maintains two internal institutions: the University Court and the University Senate. The University Court is the supreme governing body of the university and is composed of a number of 'governors', statutory mandated with overseeing its overall strategic direction and appointing both the chancellor and the principal (and vice-chancellor) of the university. The university's principal and vice-chancellor and the president of the Students' Association are ex officio governors of the Court. The University Senate, on the other hand, is statutory tasked with the overall planning, co-ordination, development and supervision of the university's academic affairs. University degrees and fellowship as well as academic honours and distinctions are awarded by and in the name of the Court, with the advice of the Senate. The current chair of the Court is Rob Woodward and the Senate is presided over by the university's principal and vice-chancellor, currently Pamela Gillies.

Academic profile

GCU offers academic programmes in all of the Scottish Funding Council funding groups but medicine, dentistry and teacher education. The 2008 Research Assessment Exercise gave the university an 'internationally recognised' research profile in a multitude of disciplines. Over 70% of the university's research submissions were judged as being internationally recognised and 30% were deemed world-leading or of international excellence. In 2015, the QAA awarded the university its highest judgement for academic standards, whilst praising the university's innovative academic approaches. In 2013, GCU was awarded the HR Excellence in Research Award by the European Commission, in recognition of its commitment to the development of researchers. This has been retained in 2015 following its two-year review.

Research 

According to the Research Excellence Framework, GCU is the top modern university in Scotland by research power. The university's social policy research impact at world-leading levels has ranked GCU as in the top 10 in the UK.

The university has three university-wide institutes that engage in cross-disciplinary research: The Institute for Applied Health Research, which carries out research on a range of health-related topics; The Institute for Sustainable Engineering and Technology Research, which carries out research on a range of disciplines aimed at minimising impact on the environment; and The Institute for Society and Social Justice Research, which carries out research on the topics of citizenship and participation, crime and justice, and gender and economy.

The university also has research centres including The Yunus Centre for Social Business and Health, the Centre for Climate Justice and the Women in Scotland's (WiSE) Economy Research Centre.

Rankings

Glasgow Caledonian University (GCU) has been ranked in the world's top 150 young universities by the Times Higher Education's 200 under age of 50 Rankings 2017

GCU is the top modern university in Scotland for research power (REF 2014 rankings).

According to the Higher Education Statistics Agency (HESA) UK Performance Indicators in Higher Education, GCU has a completion rate of 80.9 per cent, above the sector average of 80.6 per cent for Scotland.

97% of GCU graduates are in work or further study six months after graduation, according to HESA.

The Times Higher Education 2018 UK Student Experience survey named GCU as the second most improved university in the UK for student experience, up from 99th to joint 67th.

It is also a member of the Association of Commonwealth Universities, the European University Association, Universities UK, Universities Scotland, the Florence Network, the Talloires Network, the Erasmus+ Programme, and the Santander Universities Network.

Magnus Magnusson Fellowship

The Magnus Magnusson Fellowship, named in honour of former University Chancellor Magnus Magnusson, is an intellectual group based at the university and comprises leading international figures from a variety of backgrounds. The fellowship meets annually to debate and agree action on issues of major concern to society, both locally and globally. It holds an annual lecture that alternates between Glasgow, London, and Reykjavík (Magnusson's birthplace).

Muhammad Yunus gave the inaugural Magnusson Fellowship Lecture in 2008 and was formally inducted as one of the first cohort of fellowship members. Fellowship members include Will Hutton (Magnusson Fellow, 2010), former President of Ireland Mary Robinson (Magnusson Fellow, 2011), and Renata Salecl (Magnusson Fellow, 2012).

Widening access 
Glasgow Caledonian University is one of only two universities in Scotland to meet the Scottish Government's Commission for Widening Access target, which requires students from deprived areas to make up 20 per cent of entrants by 2030.

Global Networks

Oman

The university has been working with the Caledonian College of Engineering (now the National University of Science and Technology, Oman) since 1996 and offers its largest programme of transnational education there to undergraduate and postgraduate students.

Bangladesh 
The award-winning Grameen Caledonian College of Nursing (GCCN) is a partnership between GCU and the Grameen Healthcare Trust. Established as a social business in 2010, GCCN is raising healthcare education provision to an international standard and transforming the lives of young women across Bangladesh and the health and wellbeing of the population they serve.

South Africa

The university has a history of interaction with South Africa and a number of its leading figures. It was the first university to award Nelson Mandela an honorary doctorate upon his release from prison in 1990 in recognition of his leadership during the anti-apartheid movement. In accepting the honour, Mandela asked the university to offer support for reconstruction and development in South Africa and the university developed in this regard several projects to assist in research and training at a number of South African universities. Mandela officially received the honorary degree in June 1996 at a special ceremony in Buckingham Palace, and suggested the renaming of the university's Health Building after his close associate, Govan Mbeki, who was imprisoned in the cell next to him on Robben Island. The Govan Mbeki Building was officially inaugurated by Mbeki's son, President Thabo Mbeki, in June 2001 and a specially-commissioned portrait of Nelson Mandela was unveiled that year at the Building's foyer by Mandela's wife, Graça Machel. The university is also home to two significant scholarly collections on South Africa: the Anti-Apartheid Movement in Scotland Archive and the George Johannes Collection. In 2012, GCU began designing and developing work-based programmes in railway operations management for Transnet Freight Rail, South Africa's largest freight rail organisation.

Cultural Fellows

The Caledonian Cultural Fellows Initiative was set up in 2009 with the aim of enhancing university cultural life and promoting cultural engagement with wider community. Liz Lochhead, the Scots Makar, is the current honorary president of the fellowship, whose membership includes writer Anne Donovan, poet and novelist Jackie Kay, and artist Toby Paterson.

Caledonian Club

The Caledonian Club is a social and community engagement initiative involving staff and students coaching young people and their families in advancing their learning and life skills, while university-based researchers carry out long-term analysis into the process as part of a wider university research agenda into life-long learning. In 2011, the Club developed a project named 'The Tale of Two Sporting Cities', with the aim of engaging cultural exchanges between primary schools in Glasgow and London and assessing the sporting and cultural legacy of the 2012 London Summer Olympics and the 2014 Glasgow Commonwealth Games.

Student life

Students' Association
Glasgow Caledonian University Students' Association (GCUSA) is the students' association of Glasgow Caledonian University. It represents and enables Glasgow Caledonian University students to enhance all aspects of their student experience. It is located in the Students' Association Building on the Glasgow Campus and has an office at GCU London. All Glasgow Caledonian University students are automatically admitted to its membership upon matriculation.

In 2011, the Association was awarded the coveted title of Students' Union of the Year by NUS Scotland.

The Students' Association runs sports clubs like Glasgow Caledonian University RFC, societies, student magazine (The EDIT), radio station (Radio Caley), active lifestyles programme and an events programme. At a national level the Students' Association is affiliated to the National Union of Students (NUS) which lobbies and campaigns for students at a Scottish and UK level.

Graduation

GCU holds its annual graduation ceremonies during the summer and autumn and its academic attire is made by robe-maker Ede & Ravenscroft. Under the university's academic dress code, the wearing of the customary mortar boards is disallowed, as it is not part of the official academic attire that consists of gowns and hoods only, individual to each award conferred. Graduates traditionally receive their degrees at graduation ceremonies by being "capped" on the head with the Chancellor's hat, in a gesture that signifies the Chancellor's authority and status within the university. The postnominals for university graduates are prescribed with the abbreviation GlasCal.

Notable staff and alumni

Laura Bartlett, field hockey bronze medallist at the 2012 Olympic Games
Kevin Bridges, comedian
Limmy, comedian
Hans Broekhuizen, Dutch civil servant and politician (CDA), Mayor of Twenterand
Lesley Laird, Scottish Labour Party, MP
Gordon Brown, former British Prime Minister, Lecturer in Politics (1976–1980)
Michael Keating, Chair in Scottish Politics, University of Aberdeen
Andy Kerr, Scottish Labour Party politician, former Member of Parliament
Rhona Martin, curling gold medallist in the 2002 Winter Olympic Games
Gordon MacDonald, Scottish National Party MSP for Edinburgh Pentlands
Drew McIntyre, professional wrestler
Ailsa McKay, Professor of Economics
Siobhan McMahon, Scottish Labour Party MSP
Lesley McMillan, FRSE researcher in gender based violence and criminal justice
Pat Nevin, retired footballer
Eunice Olumide, model
Sikandar Raza, cricketer, Zimbabwe Cricket
Hassan Rouhani, former President of Iran
Anna Sloan, curling bronze medallist at the 2014 Winter Olympics
Gregor Virant, Minister of the Interior and Public Administration of Slovenia
Sean Michael Wilson, comic book writer
Jeane Freeman, Scottish National Party, MSP, Cabinet Secretary for Health and Sport
Gordon Smith, former footballer and Chief Executive of the Scottish Football Association

See also
 Armorial of UK universities
 List of universities in the United Kingdom
 Universities in Scotland

References

External links

 

 
Florence Network
Educational institutions established in 1993
1993 establishments in Scotland
Universities in Scotland
Universities established in the 1990s
Universities and colleges formed by merger in the United Kingdom
Universities UK